SV Boskamp is a Surinamese football club based in Groningen, Saramacca District.  The club plays in the Surinamese Hoofdklasse, the top tier of football in the nation. The club was founded on February 2, 1998.

Current squad 2011–12

Notable former coaches 
  Andy Atmodimedjo (2008–09)
  Roy Hasselbaink (2011–)

References 

Football clubs in Suriname
Boskamp
1998 establishments in Suriname